Galantis is the debut extended play by Swedish electronic music duo Galantis, released on 1 April 2014. The album features two singles,  "Smile" and "You".

Singles
Their first single with Big Beat Records, "Smile", was released that following November. Its controversial video premiered on Stereogum. "Smile" received several remixes from various artists, and an extended mix by dance music heavyweight Kaskade. In February, the duo released their second single "You". The track was subsequently played heavily at Winter Music Conference, becoming the 8th most Shazamed track at the festival.

Artworks
"Smile" also marked the first instance of the "Seafox", a creature that is the brainchild of visual artist Mat Maitland. The "Seafox" is the Galantis mascot of sorts, appearing in all their videos, cover art and even their live show. The duo also refer to their fans as Seafox Nation and can often be seen using #seafoxnation on their social media sites. Each track has an artwork that goes along with it. These artworks were released on the same date as the album. The artwork go along with audio versions of the song on their YouTube channel and on SoundCloud.

Track listing

Track 1 features vocals from Vincent Pontare.
Track 2 features vocals from Vincent Pontare and Britney Spears.
Track 3 features vocals from Leon Jean-Marie.
Track 4 features vocals from Salem Al Fakir and Vincent Pontare.
Track 5 features vocals from Cathy Dennis 
Track 6 features vocals from Jennifer Decilveo.

Charts

References

Atlantic Records EPs
2014 debut EPs
Galantis albums